Thomas "Tom" Hammond (born 18 September 1984) is a South African field hockey player who plays for the South African national team. He competed in the 2008 Summer Olympics. He also played in three World Cups.

References

External links

1984 births
Living people
South African male field hockey players
Olympic field hockey players of South Africa
2006 Men's Hockey World Cup players
Field hockey players at the 2008 Summer Olympics
2010 Men's Hockey World Cup players
2018 Men's Hockey World Cup players
20th-century South African people
21st-century South African people